Abdullah Shafiu Ibrahim is a Maldivian film actor and playback singer.

Career
Ibrahim made his film debut with the Dark Rain Entertainment production, the Ali Shifau-directed romantic comedy Vaashey Mashaa Ekee (2016) opposite Mohamed Jumayyil and Mariyam Majudha narrating the life of a happily married couple being separated due to the husband's crippling fear of commitment on his wife's pregnancy. His performance as an unfaithful boyfriend fetched him a nomination as the Best Male Debut at the 8th Gaumee Film Awards ceremony. The following year, Ibrahim featured in another Ali Shifau-directed romantic comedy, Mee Loaybakee alongside Mohamed Jumayyil and Mariyam Azza. The film, which is considered to include the largest cast in a Maldivian feature film, narrates the story of two ex-lovers sliding into the friend zone with the envy and diffidence they experience amidst a convoluted love-triangle. His performance as a comedic friend diagnosed with piles received a positive response from critics where Aishath Maaha of Avas wrote: "considering this is his second release, Ibrahim showed great potential with his admirable performance with the perfect comic timing". The film emerged as one of the highest grossing Maldivian films of 2017.

Ibrahim next starred in a recurring role in the first Maldivian web-series, a romantic drama by Fathimath Nahula, Huvaa which began streaming in November 2018. The series consists of sixty episodes and streamed through the digital platform Baiskoafu, centering around a happy and radiant family which breaks into despairing pieces after a tragic incident that led to an unaccountable loss. The series and his performance as a gang-member being arrested for murder, were positively received.

Filmography

Film

Television

Short film

Discography

Accolades

References

External links
 

Living people
People from Malé
21st-century Maldivian male actors
Maldivian male film actors
Year of birth missing (living people)